Hives is a surname. Notable people with the surname include:

 Ernest Hives, 1st Baron Hives of Duffield (1886-1965), Chairman of Rolls-Royce Ltd
 Harry Hives (1901–1974), Canadian Anglican bishop 
 Zoe Hives (born 1996), Australian tennis player

See also
 Baron Hives, a Peerage of the United Kingdom
 Hives (disambiguation)